Malwanchal University is a private  recognised university in Indore, Madhya Pradesh, India. It was established in 2016 .

References

External links
Malwanchal University Website

Private universities in India
Educational institutions established in 2016
2016 establishments in Madhya Pradesh